The 1997–98 Australian region cyclone season was a slightly below average tropical cyclone season. It ran from 1 November 1997 to 30 April 1998. The regional tropical cyclone operational plan also defines a tropical cyclone year separately from a tropical cyclone season, and the "tropical cyclone year" ran from 1 July 1997 to 30 June 1998.

Tropical cyclones in this area were monitored by four Tropical Cyclone Warning Centres (TCWCs): the Australian Bureau of Meteorology in Perth, Darwin, and Brisbane; and TCWC Port Moresby in Papua New Guinea.



Systems

Tropical Cyclone Nute 

On 19 November, TCWC Brisbane and the JTWC reported that Cyclone Nute had crossed 160°E and moved into the Australian region at its peak intensities.

Tropical Cyclone Sid 

A low-pressure system formed over the Northern Territory in late December and moved into the Timor Sea as the monsoon trough developed near Australia. A tropical depression had formed on 26 December near Darwin, Australia. The storm reached gale force six hours after developing and was named Sid by the BoM. Sid moved to the east, affecting the Northern Territory. Sid turned southeastward, crossing the Northern Territory. Sid moved fully southward, in which it weakened due to wind shear. By 28 December, Sid had weakened to below gale-status and residual low meandered around for a few days.

By 3 January, the low re-entered the Western Gulf and the BoM began to re-issue advisories on the low, which was forecast to re-intensify. The low became a depression and drifted around for another day. On 4 January, scatterometer data at 1330 UTC indicated the presence of 30-35 mph winds over the water. The depression weakened back into a low on 5 January and advisories were stopped again. However, on 7 January, the TCWC in Darwin re-issued advisories for a third time and the cyclone was forecast to re-intensify, but this did not occur. The last warning was issued on the depression at 1800 UTC. The remnant low moved into the Gulf of Carpentaria and across Queensland. The TCWC in Brisbane, Australia issued bulletins on 10 January for the low which was once Sid. The low remained quasi-stationary to a couple of days near Townsville, causing major flooding in the area. The bulletins were discontinued the next day. Heavy rains fell and several rivers flooded due to the remnant low on 11 January.

Severe Tropical Cyclone Selwyn 

Tropical Cyclone Selwyn formed 650 kilometers east-southeast of Christmas Island within the monsoon trough. Selwyn rapidly strengthened into a tropical cyclone on 27 December and reached its maximum intensity of 70 mph (110 km/h) on 28 December. After this point, Selwyn began to weaken rapidly as it moved west-northwesterly slowly. Warnings were discontinued by the Tropical Cyclone Warning Center in Perth, Australia on 31 December because winds were forecast to fall below gale-force. The remnant low drifted westward and then to the southwest with convection flaring up once in a while. Warnings were re-issued in early January due to forecasts that Selwyn would re-intensify, but this did not occur. The remnant low (formerly known as Selwyn) was tracked until 3 January.

Severe Tropical Cyclone Katrina 

Katrina became a tropical storm on 3 January and was moving slowly to the east-northeast. On 7 January, Susan moved further south allowing Katrina to intensify as it neared the Solomon Islands, this proved to be the northernmost point of Katrina's track as the storm turned east-southeast and then southeast, fluctuating in hurricane strength. On 11 January, Katrina moved south of Rennell Island and then crossed back into the Brisbane area six hours later where it crossed the 160E on its eastward journey, then the storm turned west where it maintained that course until 15 January. On the 15th, the storm moved south-southwest where it reached Category 2 strength with a barometric pressure of 940 mbar. Katrina weakened rapidly and slowed before making a tight loop on 17 and 18 January. After completing the loop, Cyclone Katrina moved east for 12 hours before moving east-southeast for three days. During that time, Katrina briefly reached Category 1 strength once more before slowing down and being affected by wind shear. By 24 January, Katrina had weakened to a tropical depression.

Severe Tropical Cyclone Tiffany 

TCWC in Perth, Australia started issuing advisories on the low 24 January. The system was of land origin and had entered the ocean. A brief surge of southeasterly flow helped the system strengthen and was given the name Tiffany the next day. Tiffany was a small system and strengthened rapidly with an estimated  gain in a 12-hour period on 26 January. The peak intensity of 930 millibars was recorded on 27 January with the maximum sustained winds of 105 mph (130 by the JTWC). The cyclone went to the west-southwest, farther and farther away from the Australian coastline. By 29 January, the system fell below hurricane-status and Perth issued its last warning the next day. The Joint Typhoon Warning Center followed the next day. No damage was reported with the system.
 Australian Report for Tiffany

Tropical Cyclone Les 

Les formed on 23 January 1998 near Darwin, Australia. The storm moved westward reaching Category 1 status before making landfall on the eastern gulf coast of the Northern Territory. Moving back out over the Timor Sea, Les hugged the coast and regained strength before making a second landfall and dissipating. Les caused extensive flooding and damage in the town of Katherine and there was one death.

Severe Tropical Cyclone Victor–Cindy 

Cyclone Victor formed from a tropical low that was the remnant low of Cyclone Katrina, that passed across northern Cape York Peninsula. The low was weak and poorly structured as it moved to the north of Kimberley during 8 February; however, its organization improved significantly on 9 February, as it moved west-southwestward, away from the north Kimberley coast. An LNG tanker reported 40 knot winds near the center during the late afternoon of 10 February, and the storm was named Victor that night. It continued to move westward and remained weak during 11 February, but intensified during 12 February. An eye became visible during the morning of 13 February, as Victor reached peak intensity. Victor continued moving west-southwestward but then progressively weakened. By the morning of 15 February, the system was sheared, with a fully-exposed low-level center apparent on satellite imagery. Victor was a small cyclone for its whole lifetime and was surrounded by very high environmental pressures. As Victor accelerated towards a west-southwestly direction on the edge of a subtropical high, it crossed the 90th meridian east early on 16 February, and was subsequently briefly renamed by Mauritius as Tropical Cyclone Cindy. Later that day, the Regional Specialised Meteorological Centre in Réunion (RSMC La Reunion) downgraded Cindy to tropical disturbance intensity.

Tropical Cyclone May 

May formed from an area of low pressure on 25 February 1998 near the Australian coast. May moved southward before making landfall near Mornington Island on 26 February. After that the storm dissipated while moving inland. There were no reports of deaths or damage from Tropical Storm May.

Tropical Low Elsie

Tropical Cyclone Nathan 

Tropical Cyclone Nathan formed from a tropical low embedded weak monsoon trough that had formed when Tropical Cyclone Yali had reached cyclone intensity. Upper-level outflow was favorable, but wind shear made it restricted for rapid development. Nathan started off developing rapidly, the first warning, issued on 21 March, classified the system as a  tropical cyclone. Nathan was a small system in an environment of weak steering flow, causing the storm to move erratically but slowly to the east. Nathan turned southward, coming to within  of Cooktown, Australia on 23 March. The TCWC in Brisbane kept Nathan's wind speed at 50-60 mph, whereas the Joint Typhoon Warning Center boosted it up to hurricane-strength on 23 March.

After approaching the coast of Queensland, Nathan came under the influence of the monsoon flow from Tropical Cyclone Yali. The storm moved east-northeasterly very rapidly and became more easterly on 25 March. By the morning of 26 March, the circulation was becoming sheared. The shear was possibly coming from an extratropical system (formerly known as Yali). Nathan turned to the south and the Brisbane TCWC downgraded the system into a tropical low, ceasing advisories. By 1200 UTC on 27 March, Nathan showed signs of redevelopment near the Chesterfield Islands. Nathan moved westward and approached Australia again, weakening slowly.

The JTWC kept Nathan as a minimal tropical cyclone until 31 March when it was downgraded into a weakening low.

Tropical Low 35S 

A low formed off the coast of Australia on 16 April 1998. The depression moved southwestward before making landfall in Western Australia on the 19th. There were reports of heavy rain but no report of damage or deaths from the unnamed storm.

Other systems 
During 25 March the JTWC, RSMC Nadi and TCWC Brisbane reported that Cyclone Yali had moved into the Australian region from the South Pacific basin. However, RSMC Nadi and TCWC Brisbane both treated the system as a post tropical cyclone, after an upper cut-off low had captured the cyclone had caused Yali to lose its tropical characteristics.

Season effects 

|-
| Nute ||  || bgcolor=#| || bgcolor=#| || bgcolor=#| || None ||  ||  ||
|-
| Sid ||  || bgcolor=#| || bgcolor=#| || bgcolor=#| || Northern Territory ||  ||  ||
|-
| Les ||  || bgcolor=#| || bgcolor=#| || bgcolor=#| || Northern Australia ||  ||  ||
|-
| May ||  || bgcolor=#| || bgcolor=#| || bgcolor=#| || Northern Territory ||  ||  ||
|-
| Nathan ||  || bgcolor=#| || bgcolor=#| || bgcolor=#| || Queensland ||  ||  ||
|-
| 35S ||  || bgcolor=#| || bgcolor=#| || bgcolor=#| || Western Australia ||  ||  ||
|}

See also 

 List of Southern Hemisphere tropical cyclone seasons
 Atlantic hurricane seasons: 1997, 1998
 Pacific hurricane seasons: 1997, 1998
 Pacific typhoon seasons: 1997, 1998
 North Indian Ocean cyclone seasons: 1997, 1998

References

External links 
 Joint Typhoon Warning Center (JTWC) .
 Australian Government Bureau of Meteorology.
 World Meteorological Organization
 RA V Tropical Cyclone Committee Final Report
 Joint Typhoon Warning Center 1998 ATCR
 Raw cyclone track data
 BoM Monthly Significant Weather Summaries
 1997-98 Annual Summary (Western Australia)
 September 1997 to June 1998 Tropical Cyclone Summaries and Operational Track Data

 
Australian region cyclone seasons